The Aquarium of Cattolica is the second largest public aquarium in Italy. It is located in Cattolica on the Adriatic coast. It was inaugurated in 2000.

Key features 
The Structure of this aquarium has a summer camp for the children of Italians Who lived abroad. The careful renovations ended in June 2000, under the aegis of the Soprintendenza per i Beni Ambientali e Architettonici, gave back the buildings to their ancient splendour and improved all the area, full of history and sea traditions. The Aquarium is on an area of 110 thousand square metres, towards the sea, perfectly integrated in the urban texture of Cattolica and with large parkings. In the big garden (more than 49.000 square metres) one will find relaxing areas, restaurant, bar, shops, children entertainment, exhibitions, cultural or sport events.

References

External links

Museums in Emilia-Romagna
Aquaria in Italy
2000 establishments in Italy